The 1st New Brunswick Legislative Assembly represented New Brunswick between January 3, 1786, and 1792. The lower house was the Legislative Assembly and the upper house was named the Legislative Council.

The assembly sat at the pleasure of the Governor of New Brunswick, Thomas Carleton. The first and second sessions were held at the Mallard House, an inn in Saint John. Subsequent sessions were held in Fredericton.

Amos Botsford was chosen as speaker for the house.

Composition 
The lower house was the Legislative Assembly and the upper house was named the Legislative Council. The governor of New Brunswick was responsible for the appointment of the Legislative Council.

History

Members

Notes and references 

Foot-prints ; or Incidents in early history of New Brunswick, JW Lawrence (1883)
Journal of the votes and proceedings of the House of Assembly of ... New-Brunswick from ... January to ... March, 1786 (1786)

01
1786 in Canada
1787 in Canada
1788 in Canada
1789 in Canada
1790 in Canada
1791 in Canada
1792 in Canada
1786 establishments in New Brunswick
1792 disestablishments in New Brunswick